Marie de la Mer may refer to:

 Our Lady, Star of the Sea, a title for the Virgin Mary
 Saintes-Maries-de-la-Mer, a French city

See also
 Mary Star of the Sea (disambiguation)